Lucas Bueno (died 7 September 1668) was a Spanish Roman Catholic prelate who served as Bishop of Malta from 1666 to 1668.

Biography
Bueno was appointed as Titular Archbishop of Thessalonica on 15 September 1664. After the see of Malta had been vacant for 3 years, the former inquisitor of Malta, Fabio Chigi and now Pope Alexander VII, nominated Bueno as Bishop of Malta on 15 December 1666. Subsequently, he was also nominated as Titular Archbishop Rossano. Inquisitor Ranuzzi wrote of Bueno that he was renowned for his gentility with people. He died after only a little over two years as Bishop of Malta.

References

1668 deaths
Year of birth missing
17th-century Spanish people
17th-century Roman Catholic bishops in Malta
Spanish Roman Catholic bishops
Bishops of Malta